The men's +90 kg weightlifting competitions at the 1956 Summer Olympics in Melbourne took place on 26 November at the Royal Exhibition Building. It was the eighth appearance of the heavyweight class, and second time at the above-90 kg weight. Previously, all weightlifters above 82.5 kg were included in the heavyweight class.

Competition format

Each weightlifter had three attempts at each of the three lifts. The best score for each lift was summed to give a total. The weightlifter could increase the weight between attempts (minimum of 5 kg between first and second attempts, 2.5 kg between second and third attempts) but could not decrease weight. If two or more weightlifters finished with the same total, the competitors' body weights were used as the tie-breaker (lighter athlete wins).

Records
Prior to this competition, the existing world and Olympic records were as follows.

Results

New records

References

Weightlifting at the 1956 Summer Olympics